Salter Science was a brand of science kits sold by Thomas Salter Ltd., a Scotland-based company which manufactured toys and science activity kits for children. Kits included activities with electricity, microscopy, magnetism and crystal gardens, but the company is probably best known for their chemistry sets. The company also produced other items such as an "Adventure Kit" consisting of a water bottle, compass, toy binoculars and a real working camera. Some toys were related to TV series, such as the 'KOJAK' ACTION SET. It also produced crafts plaster moulding sets Frog & Owl.

Thomas Salter Ltd. was founded in London in 1913, moved to Glenrothes, Fife, and closed in 1992.

Chemistry sets from Salter Science included a various number of chemicals, which were numbered, so that the numbers were the same across the sets. Some of the chemicals included were:

 Copper Sulfate
 Sodium Carbonate
 Calcium Oxychloride
 Iron Filings
 Calcium Hydroxide
 Sodium Hydrogen Sulfate
 Tartaric Acid
 Methyl Orange
 Ferrous Sulfate
 Ammonium Carbonate
 Magnesium Ribbon
 Copper Wire
 Ammonium Chloride
 Sodium Thiosulfate
 Sodium Perborate
 Cobalt Chloride

Also commonly included were small glass test tubes, a spatula, a funnel, corks with and without holes, glass tubes that would fit in the cork holes, a tiny glass saw to cut the tubes, a small bottle brush, test tube racks and a methylated spirit burner for heating.

The instruction manual told how to heat the glass tubes to make them bend, and also how to make them stretch and cut them in half using the glass saw in the middle of the stretch to make two pipettes.

References

Toy brands
Educational toys